Raymond Ltd (|) is largest integrated manufacturer of fabric in the world based in Mumbai, Maharashtra. It has over 60% market share in suiting in India. It is also India's biggest woolen fabric maker. Textile division of the company has a distribution network of more than 4,000 multi-brand outlets and over 637 exclusive retail shops in the domestic market itself. Suitings are available in India in over 400 towns through 30,000 retailers and an exclusive chain is present in over 150 cities across India. Its products exports to over 55 countries including US, Canada, Europe, Japan and the Middle East. It has more than 20,000 design and colours of suiting fabric which makes it one of largest collection of designs and colours by single company. It was listed as India's most trusted apparel brand by The Brand Trust Report in 2015.

History
The brand name Raymond was derived from Albert Raymond & Abraham Jacob Raymond.

It was incorporated as the Raymond Woollen mill during the year 1925 near Thane Creek. Lala Kailashpat Singhania took over The Raymond Woollen Mill in the year 1944. In 1958, then with lot of hardwork and efforts Mr. Gopalkrishna Singhania and thereafter Mr. Vijaypat Singhania made this small fabric company into an world renowned brand. The exclusive Raymond Retail showroom, King's Corner, was opened at Ballard Estate in Mumbai. In 1968, Raymond had set up a readymade garments plant at Thane.  A new manufacturing facility was set up at Jalgaon (Maharashtra) during the year 1979 to meet the increasing demand for worsted woollen fabrics. In the year 2000, Vijaypat Singhania handed over his company to his only son Gautam Singhania and in the year 2015, he gave 37.57% of the total shares to him.

In November 2015, Raymond announced that Sanjay Behl would be taking over as CEO, and M Shivkumar as CFO.

References

External links
Indian woollen fabric maker Raymond Ltd buys finest Australian wool
Raymond launches Notting Hill
Raymond eyes retail growth in non-metros

Textile companies based in Maharashtra
Manufacturing companies based in Mumbai
Manufacturing companies established in 1925
Indian companies established in 1925
Companies listed on the National Stock Exchange of India
Companies listed on the Bombay Stock Exchange